Vangueriella spinosa is a species of flowering plant in the family Rubiaceae. It is found in western Tropical Africa.

References 

Vanguerieae